Julebord (Danish: julefrokost, Norwegian: julebord or jolebord, Swedish: julbord) is a Scandinavian feast or banquet during the Christmas season  where  traditional Christmas food and alcoholic beverages are served. Originally, the julebord belonged to Christmas itself, i.e. the period from Christmas Day and onwards. Today julebord is often organized by employers or organizations for the employees or members.

Many julebords are characterized by large amounts of food and drink, both traditional and new, hot and cold dishes. There is often lively partying and the party can be an important social meeting place for colleagues. Julebords are a popular tradition that creates high season for the restaurant industry, the taxi industry and ferry companies during this season.

Etymology
The Norwegian word julebord and the Swedish word julbord directly translates as "Christmas table", while the Danish word julefrokost means "Christmas lunch". 

[[File:prok ribs.jpg|thumb|Christmas Pork ribs (svineribbe''')]]

Traditional Julebord cuisine
Traditional Christmas food is usually served at Julebord events. These include: Rice pudding (risengrød), pork rib (ribbe), lamb or mutton (pinnekjøtt), spicy sausage (medisterpølse) and lutefisk. The meal is usually served along with sour cabbage (surkål), brussels sprout and lingonberry jam. It is customary to drink mulled wine  (glögg), Christmas beer (juleøl'') or akevitt as an aperitif.

Swedish "Julbord"
The Swedish julbord differs from its Norwegian and Danish counterparts. The Swedish julbord is a form of smörgåsbord and the main meal served on Christmas.

See also
Gottebord
Smörgåsbord
Christmas dinner
Joulupöytä

References

External links
  Danish Julefrokost
 Swedish  Julbord
  Norwegian Julebord
Christmas meals and feasts
Norwegian cuisine
Swedish cuisine
Danish cuisine
Christmas in Denmark
Christmas in Norway
Christmas in Sweden